The 1924 Lafayette Leopards football team was an American football team that represented Lafayette College as an independent during the 1924 college football season. In its first season under head coach Herb McCracken, the team compiled a 7–2 record. Charlie Berry was the team captain.  The team played its home games at March Field in Easton, Pennsylvania.

Schedule

References

Lafayette
Lafayette Leopards football seasons
Lafayette Leopards football